Dudley was platted in 1846.  The town of Dudley was destroyed by the Flood of 1851, many of its citizens relocated to Carlisle, Iowa.

Sources

Populated places established in 1846
Ghost towns in Iowa
Populated places in Polk County, Iowa
1846 establishments in Iowa Territory